Crypsis schoenoides is a species of grass known by the common names swamp pricklegrass, swamp timothy, and cowpond grass. This grass is native to Europe but it is present in most other continents where it was introduced and took hold. This is an annual grass with purple-tinted green stems which forms mats and low clumps near water. It has wide-sheathed leaves and large sheaths that partially cover the inflorescences. The clublike inflorescence may exceed 4 centimeters in length and two in width. It is chunky and purple or purplish-green.

References

External links
Jepson Manual Treatment
USDA Plants Profile
Photo gallery

Chloridoideae
Flora of Malta